The Pinhook Draw fight took place 15–16 June 1881 near Moab, Utah. The combatants were 30 to 65 Ute and Paiute Native Americans (Indians) and about three dozen white settlers, mostly Anglo cowboys and miners from southwestern Colorado and southeastern Utah. The settlers were attempting to punish the Utes for their depredations in the region and to recover stolen livestock. They were in pursuit of an encampment of Utes when the Utes ambushed them in Pinhook Draw. Ten whites were killed and between two and 22 Utes.

Background
In early historic times, southeastern Utah and southwestern Colorado were inhabited by Utes and some related Paiutes. Both tribes were nomadic hunter gatherers who moved with the seasons from place to place to utilize the limited resources of this desert and mountain area. Despite the prohibition in the treaty on permanent settlements on the mining land, Anglo miners and cattle ranchers rushed into the area.

In 1879, two events caused the Utes to lose most of the remainder of their land in Colorado: the Meeker Massacre and the propaganda campaign called "The Ute must Go" by Colorado Governor Frederick W. Pitkin. In the aftermath of the Meeker Massacre, most of the Utes' land was confiscated and opened to Anglo settlement and the northern Ute bands were expelled from Colorado to a much smaller reservation in Utah. The southern Ute bands retained small reservations in southwestern Colorado. A number of Utes continued to live off the reservations in southeastern Utah, largely uninhabited by Anglos until 1880.

Relations between the miners and cattle ranchers and the Utes in southwestern Colorado were poor.  The Utes were accused of stealing horses and cattle, begging food, robbing cabins, and making threats. In 1880, the newspaper in Dolores, Colorado said the Anglo settlers should "muster every man into active service, procure guns, ammunition, and other necessities, and pursue, kill the red-skinned devils."  The Ute view was that the Anglos had broken a treaty and confiscated Ute land needed by them to survive.

Opening shots
On 1 May 1881, a group of Utes killed two ranchers near Dolores in a gun battle sparked by a dispute. The two groups of Utes numbered about 90, including 30 men. (Another estimate of the number of Utes was 95, including 65 men.) They stole horses in this area and killed livestock. Monticello residents assembled a posse of 25 civilian men and followed the Ute's trail into the La Sal Mountains. They were joined by another posse of 65 men, mostly cowboys, from Colorado who were also on the search for Utes and stolen livestock. After a long and difficult search, the combined posses found the Ute camp on 12 June near present-day Warner Lake in the northwestern La Sals. The elected leader of the posse, Bill Dawson, planned to attack the Utes, but the number of men remaining in his force numbered only about three dozen after many men dropped out during the pursuit or were unwilling to fight the Utes. The Utes leader, to the extent they had a leader, was called Mancos Jim.

On 15 June, Dawson and his men attacked the Ute encampment and the Utes fled. Dawson captured a large part of the Ute horse herd, estimated at 1,500 head, and nine women.  He left 13 men behind to guard the women and the horses and continued pursuing the Utes. The women soon escaped and took with them not only the Ute horses but also the cowboy's horses. The cowboys walked to Moab.

The battle
Dawson and his men pursued the Utes for about  northwards into a narrow canyon called Pinhook Draw near the upper entrance of Castle Canyon. There, from higher ground, the Utes ambushed the cowboys. The details of the battle are contradictory, but a six-man advance force of the cowboys was wiped out during the course of the afternoon. That evening Dawson's group was reinforced by the 13 men who had walked to Moab, giving him a total force of about two dozen, three of whom were seriously wounded. He did not know the fate of his advance party.

The next morning ten men from Moab joined Dawson and he returned to Pinhook Draw to find his missing advance party. The cowboys were again attacked by the Utes and retreated to Mason Spring. Dawson sent a man to Rico, Colorado with a request for reinforcements.  On 24 June two dozen men arrived from Rico. By that time the battle was long over. The Utes had moved along, heading back for Colorado. The three wounded men were sent to Moab for treatment. On 20 June Dawson and his men returned to Pinhook Draw and found the bodies of those in the advance party. The final toll of dead cowboys was ten.  A later search found the bodies of a Ute woman and man killed by the cowboys during the battle. Mancos Jim was reported later by one source to have said that 22 Utes had been killed in the battle.

Aftermath
On their return home, the cowboys met four companies of African-American buffalo soldiers (about 190 men) commanded by Captain Henry Carroll, an experienced Indian fighter. Carroll didn't want civilians interfering in Indian affairs and threatened to arrest the members of the posse.  According to one account, an armed confrontation between soldiers and cowboys took place, but was resolved when two members of the posse agreed to guide the soldiers on the trail of the Utes. The soldiers' search for the Utes was fruitless, but two were later arrested on the Ute Reservation in Colorado and sent to prison for their part in the battle.  Several Utes who participated in the battle—Mancos Jim, Polk, and Posey—would be prominent in southeastern Utah for decades to come.

Footnotes

History of Colorado
History of Utah
Ute people
Paiute people
Native American history of Colorado
Native American history of Utah
1881 in the United States
Conflicts in 1881